"Find My Baby" is a song by American electronic musician Moby. It was released as the eighth and final single from his fifth studio album Play in November 2000. The song features samples from the song "Joe Lee's Rock" by Boy Blue.

Track listing
 CD single 
 "Find My Baby" – 3:58
 "Honey"  –  3:13 
 "Flower" – 3:25

 CD single 
 "Find My Baby"  – 3:58
 "Whispering Wind" – 6:08
 "Find My Baby"  – 3:09

Charts

References

External links

1999 songs
2000 singles
Moby songs
Songs written by Moby
Breakbeat songs
Techno songs